Carl Darling Buck (October 2, 1866 – February 8, 1955) was an American philologist.

Biography
Buck was born on October 2, 1866, in Maine (either in Bucksport or in Orland).

He graduated from Yale in 1886, was a graduate student there for three years, and studied at the American School of Classical Studies in Athens from 1887 to 1889, and in Leipzig from 1889–1892.

In 1892 he became professor of Sanskrit and Indo-European comparative philology at the University of Chicago, and was later named Martin A. Ryerson Distinguished Service Professor of Comparative Philology.

In his early career, he concentrated on the Italic dialects, including among his published work, Der Vocalismus der oskischen Sprache (1892), The Oscan-Umbrian Verb-System (1895), and Grammar of Oscan and Umbrian, with a collection of inscriptions and a glossary (1904), and a précis of the Italic languages in Johnson's Universal Cyclopaedia. He collaborated with W.G. Hale in the preparation of A Latin Grammar (1903).

Later, he worked extensively on the Greek dialects, publishing: The Greek dialects; grammar, selected inscriptions, glossary (1910), Comparative grammar of Greek and Latin (1933); and on more general Indo-European issues.

His Dictionary of Selected Synonyms in the Principal Indo-European Languages was called by Calvert Watkins "a treasure house of words, word origins, expressions, and ideas..., a monument to a great American scholar".

Upon his death, the New York Times reported that Buck spoke 30 languages. Many of Buck's books went through multiple editions, and several are still in print.

Bibliography
 Buck C D (1892). Der Vocalismus der oskischen Sprache. Leipzig: K. F. Koehler's Antiquarium.
 Buck C D (1895). The Oscan-Umbrian verb-system. Chicago: University of Chicago Press.
 Buck C D (1903). A sketch of the linguistic conditions of Chicago. Chicago: The University of Chicago Press.
 Buck C D (1904). Grammar of Oscan and Umbrian. Boston: Ginn and Company.
 Buck C D (1905). Elementarbuch der oskisch-umbrischen Dialekte. Heidelberg: C. Winter.
 Buck C D (1910). Introduction to the study of the Greek dialects: grammar, selected inscriptions, glossary. Boston: Ginn and Company.
 Buck C D (1933). Comparative grammar of Greek and Latin. Chicago: University of Chicago Press.
 Buck C D (1949). A dictionary of selected synonyms in the principal Indo–European languages: a contribution to the history of ideas. Chicago: University of Chicago Press. LINK (Academia.EDU)
 Buck C D & Hale W G (1903). A Latin grammar. New York: Mentzer, Bush.
 Buck C D & Petersen W (1945). A reverse index of Greek nouns and adjectives, arranged by terminations with brief historical introductions. Chicago: University of Chicago Press.

References

Notes

General references

External links
 

Carl Darling Buck, A Grammar of Oscan and Umbrian on the Internet Archive

1866 births
1955 deaths
American philologists
American Sanskrit scholars
Etymologists
Linguistic Society of America presidents
People from Maine